The Q Theatre was a British theatre located near Kew Bridge in Brentford, west London, which operated between 1924 and 1958. It was built on the site of the former Kew Bridge Studios.

The theatre, seating 490 in 25 rows with a central aisle, was opened in 1924 by Jack and Beatie de Leon with the financial support of Jack's sister Delia. It was one of a number of small, committed, independent theatre companies which included the Hampstead Everyman, the Arts Theatre Club and the Gate Theatre Studio. These theatres took risks by producing new and experimental plays which, although often at first thought to be commercially unviable on the West-End stage, later went on to transfer successfully.

Actors including Dirk Bogarde, Joan Collins, Vivien Leigh, Margaret Lockwood, Barry Morse, and Anthony Quayle started their theatrical careers here. Peter Brook, Tony Richardson, Charles Hawtrey and William Gaskell directed plays here and the theatre staged the first plays of Terence Rattigan and William Douglas-Home.

Opening night 
The new enterprise was originally advertised as "A Bright, Cosy Theatre for the presentation of successful WEST END PLAYS". The opening night was scheduled for September 1924, but the doors finally opened to the public on Boxing Day, 26 December 1924 with a production of Gertrude Jenning's The Young Person in Pink. But the occasion was marred by the over-selling of tickets, resulting in a number of disappointed and angry ticket-holders.

Local press retrospective 
In April 1992, the theatre critic of the Richmond and Twickenham Times series of local newspapers, wrote the following retrospective to welcome Kenneth Barrow's history of the theatre:

References 
Citations

Further reading
 Chambers, Colin (ed.), Continuum Companion to Twentieth Century Theatre, Continuum, London (2002) 

1924 establishments in England
1958 disestablishments in England
Brentford, London
Former theatres in London
Theatres completed in 1924